Into the Night is the fifth EP by The Raveonettes and was released on 24 April 2012. This is the third release co-produced by Richard Gottehrer and the first since Pretty in Black released in 2005. Singer Sune Rose Wagner describes the EP as "a delightfully damaged ode to the letdowns of lost love."

Reception
The EP received generally positive reviews upon its release. At Metacritic, which assigns a normalised rating out of 100 to reviews from mainstream critics, the EP received an average score of 72, based on four reviews, which indicates "Generally favorable reviews".

Track listing

Release history

References

2012 EPs
The Raveonettes albums
The Orchard (company) albums
Albums produced by Richard Gottehrer